Ed Stone Is Dead was a 2002 BBC sitcom starring Richard Blackwood, Daniel Brocklebank, Bill Paterson and Claudie Blakley. It centers on Ed Stone (Blackwood) who is accidentally killed by the grim reaper Nigel (Paterson) and becomes half-dead.

The show ran for a single season with 13 episodes, each 30 minutes long.

It was later repeated on Trouble.

External links

UR episode guide

2002 British television series debuts
2003 British television series endings
2000s British sitcoms
BBC television sitcoms
English-language television shows